Ahmed Faiz Bin Marzouq (born 6 September 1979) is a Saudi Arabian long jumper. His personal best jump is 8.39 metres, achieved in August 2006 in Lemgo.

He won the bronze medal at the 2006 Asian Games and finished eighth at the 2007 World Championships. He won the long jump gold medal at the 2009 Asian Indoor Games, setting a Games record mark of 7.96 m.

He was banned for two years in June 2010 after failing a doping test due to amphetamine use.

See also
List of doping cases in athletics

References

1979 births
Living people
Saudi Arabian male long jumpers
Asian Games medalists in athletics (track and field)
Athletes (track and field) at the 2006 Asian Games
Athletes (track and field) at the 2014 Asian Games
Doping cases in athletics
Saudi Arabian sportspeople in doping cases
Asian Games bronze medalists for Saudi Arabia
Medalists at the 2006 Asian Games
21st-century Saudi Arabian people